Wu Yiwen (born August 5, 1986 in Shanghai) is a Chinese Olympic synchronized swimmer, reaching  in height. She won a silver medal in team competition at the 2012 Summer Olympics, and previously swam in the 2006 Asian Games in Doha and 2010 Asian Games in Guangzhou.

References 

Living people
Olympic silver medalists for China
Chinese synchronized swimmers
Olympic synchronized swimmers of China
Synchronized swimmers at the 2012 Summer Olympics
1986 births
Olympic medalists in synchronized swimming
Asian Games medalists in artistic swimming
Synchronized swimmers from Shanghai
Artistic swimmers at the 2006 Asian Games
Artistic swimmers at the 2010 Asian Games
Medalists at the 2012 Summer Olympics
World Aquatics Championships medalists in synchronised swimming
Synchronized swimmers at the 2011 World Aquatics Championships
Synchronized swimmers at the 2009 World Aquatics Championships
Asian Games gold medalists for China
Medalists at the 2006 Asian Games
Medalists at the 2010 Asian Games